This was the first edition of the tournament since 2011.

Evan King and Hunter Reese won the title after defeating Andrey Golubev and Aleksandr Nedovyesov 6–2, 7–6(7–4) in the final.

Seeds

Draw

References

External links
 Main draw

Zagreb Open - Doubles
Zagreb Open